The 1995 McDonald's All-American Boys Game was an All-star basketball game played on Sunday, April 2, 1995 at the Kiel Center in St. Louis, Missouri. The game's rosters featured the best and most highly recruited high school boys graduating in 1995. The game was the 18th annual version of the McDonald's All-American Game first played in 1978.

1995 game
The game was telecast live by CBS. Chauncey Billups did not play due to a shoulder injury. Before the game, some of the jerseys of the West team were stolen from the locker room: as a result, Kris Clack had to play with a jersey without his name on the back, and Taymon Domzalski and Paul Pierce had to wear duplicates of Traylor's number 54 and McCoy's number 35, respectively. The first points were scored by East's Sam Okey with a lay-up. The game was dominated by big men, and Kevin Garnett won the MVP award recording 18 points, 11 rebounds, 4 assists and 3 blocks in 22 minutes of play. Other players who starred were Pierce, who was the top scorer of the game with 28 points, Ron Mercer (who played for his coach Steve Smith of Oak Hill Academy), who scored 19 points, and Stephon Marbury who had 11 points and 10 assists. The final score was 126 to 115 but McDonald's lists the result as 125-115. Many players arrived at the game undecided about their college choice. Only one of them declared for the 1995 NBA Draft: Kevin Garnett, who became the first player in 20 years to be drafted out of high school with the 5th overall pick in the draft. Of the 22 players selected, 15 played in the NBA.

East roster

West roster

Coaches
The East team was coached by:
 Head Coach Steve Smith of Oak Hill Academy (Mouth of Wilson, Virginia)

The West team was coached by:
 Head Coach Dave Luechtefeld of Okawville High School (Okawville, Illinois)

All-American Week

Schedule 
 Thursday, March 30: Coca-Cola JamFest
 Slam Dunk Contest 
 Three-Point Shoot-out
 Sunday, April 2: 18th Annual Boys All-American Game

The Coca-Cola JamFest is a skills-competition evening featuring basketball players who demonstrate their skills in two crowd-entertaining ways.  The slam dunk contest was first held in 1987, and a 3-point shooting challenge was added in 1989.

Contest winners 
 The 1995 Slam Dunk contest was won by Vince Carter.
 The 1995 3-point shoot-out was won by Louis Bullock.

References

External links
McDonald's All-American on the web
McDonald's All-American all-time rosters
McDonald's All-American rosters at Basketball-Reference.com
Game stats at Realgm.com

1994–95 in American basketball
1995
1995 in sports in Missouri
Basketball competitions in St. Louis
20th century in St. Louis